The Aberdare Urban District Council was established in 1894 and covered the parish of Aberdare. Its responsibilities included public health, sanitation, roads and public works generally.

There were five wards, namely Aberaman (also known as No. 5 Ward), Blaengwawr (also known as No. 4 Ward), Gadlys (also known as No. 2 Ward), Llwydcoed (also known as No. 1 Ward), and the Town Ward (also known as No. 3 Ward).  At this time, one member was elected from each ward on an annual basis.

An election was held in April 1906. It was preceded by the 1905 election and followed by the 1907 election. The term of office of members elected at the 1903 election came to an end and those elected were to serve until 1909.

Three of the four wards were contested, with Labour candidates returned unopposed at Aberaman and Blaengwawr. The election was not said to have been fought on political lines with a backlash against retiring members.

(*) denotes sitting member

Results

Aberaman Ward

Blaengwawr Ward

Gadlys Ward

Llwydcoed Ward

Town Ward

References

Bibliography
 
 
 

1906
1906 Welsh local elections